In music, Op. 115 stands for Opus number 115. Compositions that are assigned this number include:

 Arnold – Clarinet Concerto No. 2
 Beethoven – Zur Namensfeier
 Brahms – Clarinet Quintet
 Dvořák – Armida (Dvořák)
 Fauré – Piano Quintet No. 2
 Prokofiev – Sonata for Solo Violin
 Ries – Piano Concerto No. 4
 Sallinen – Concerto for Two Accordions, Strings and Percussion
 Schumann – Overture and incidental music, Manfred